Metellina mengei is a spider of the family Tetragnathidae that is found in Europe up to Georgia. It was once considered a form of M. segmentata that occurs in spring. M. mengei is much rarer than M. segmentata.

Description
Metellina mengei is very similar to Metellina segmentata, from which it can only be discerned by comparing genital features. It is about 5 mm long. Adults are found from May to July.

References

Tetragnathidae
Spiders of Europe
Spiders of Georgia (country)
Spiders described in 1870